Tanoai Reed (born February 10, 1974) is an American stuntman and actor. He is best known as the stunt double for his cousin Dwayne "The Rock" Johnson.

Early life
Tanoai Reed was born in Honolulu, Hawaiʻi, on February 10, 1974. He is primarily of Samoan descent with smaller amounts of Irish, Norwegian, and Swedish ancestry. After the separation of his parents, he grew up in California before being sent back to Hawaiʻi to live with his grandmother. He was educated at Kahuku High School and the University of Hawaiʻi.

Career
Reed's stunt career began when he worked on Waterworld (1995), and he began steady work as a stunt double for his cousin Dwayne "The Rock" Johnson on The Scorpion King (2002). His other work includes acting in the music video for the Black Eyed Peas song "Pump It" (2005), playing one of the villains fought by Fergie. He also appears in the 2008 relaunch of American Gladiators as the gladiator Toa. His first episode of Gladiators saw him performing a shortened version of "Ka Mate", a New Zealand Māori haka, before beginning his defense of the top of the pyramid.

Filmography 
 Skyscraper (2018) (stunt double: Dwayne Johnson)
 San Andreas (2015) (stunt double: Dwayne Johnson)
 Furious 7 (2015) (stunt double: Dwayne Johnson)
 Hercules (2014) (stunt double: Dwayne Johnson)
 Fast & Furious 6 (2013) (stunt double: Dwayne Johnson)
 Road to Paloma (2013) (Moose)
 Hawaii Five-0 (2013)
 Iron Man 2 (2010) (Security Guard)
 The Other Guys (2010) (stunt double: Dwayne Johnson)
 Blood and Bone (2009) (Good Tooth Street Fighter)
 Spring Breakdown (2009) (Bouncer, stuntman)
 Against the Dark (2009) (Tagart)
 Dollhouse (2009) (Season 2, Episode 10 "the Attic") (Arcane, the Dark Figure)
 Get Smart (2008) (stunt double: Dwayne Johnson - uncredited, stunts)
 Urban Justice (2007) (stunt performer)  
 The Game Plan (2007) (stunt double) (stunts) 
 Half Past Dead 2 (2007) (V) (stunts) 
 Epic Movie (2007) (stunts) 
 Gridiron Gang (2006) (stunt double: The Rock) 
 You, Me and Dupree (2006) (stunts) 
 Southland Tales (2006) (co-stunt coordinator) 
 Doom (2005) (stunts) 
 Be Cool (2005) (stunt double: The Rock) 
 Dark Justice (2004) (Batman: Aaron Schoenke films) 
 Max Havoc: Curse of the Dragon (2004) (stunts) 
 Walking Tall (2004) (stunt double: Dwayne Johnson) 
 The Stepford Wives (2004) Tonkiro
 The Rundown (2003) (stunt double: Dwayne Johnson)
 Charlie's Angels: Full Throttle (2003) (wrestler) 
 Daredevil (2003) (stunts) 
 The Tuxedo (2002) (stunts - uncredited) 
 The Scorpion King (2002) (stunt double: Mathayus) 
 Angel (1999) TV series (stunts) (unknown episodes) 
 Buffy the Vampire Slayer (1997) TV series (stunts) (unknown episodes) 
 Nash Bridges (1996) TV series (stunts) (unknown episodes) 
 Baywatch Nights (1995) TV series (stunts) (unknown episodes) 
 Waterworld (1995) (stunts)
 Priest (2011) Brave Priest

References

External links

Official page on MySpace

Living people
1974 births
American stunt performers
American people of Irish descent
American people of Swedish descent
American people of Norwegian descent
American people of Samoan descent
Actors of Samoan descent
People from Hawaii
Anoa'i family